Cockle Bay may refer to:

Cockle Bay, New Zealand, a suburb of Manukau City
Cockle Bay (Queensland), on Magnetic Island, Australia
Cockle Bay (Sydney), New South Wales, Australia